Hunter Sam (born 30 July 1984) is an Australian professional boxer.

Sam has fought multiple credentialed boxers including David Aloua, Kali Meehan, Bowie Tupou (for WBO African title), Solomon Haumono (for WBA PABA title), Willie Nasio and more. Sam is the son of IBF World super middleweight title contender, Doug Sam.

Professional boxing titles
World Boxing Foundation 
WBF Asia Pacific heavyweight title (233¾Ibs)
Australian National Boxing Federation
Australian National heavyweight title (239½Ibs)

Professional boxing record

References

External links

1984 births
Living people
Heavyweight boxers
Australian male boxers